Sher Mama is 1983 Pakistani Punjabi language Action film, directed by Imtiaz Quresh and produced by Agha Imtiaz Ali Khan. The film actors are Sultan Rahi, Mumtaz, Mustafa Qureshi and Iqbal Hassan.

Cast
 Sultan Rahi
 Mumtaz - Noor
 Mustafa Qureshi - Kartar Singh
 Iqbal Hassan - Garnail Singh
 Durdana Rehman - Basanto
 Qavi Khan - Akbar
 Nayyar Sultana - Sabara
 Rangeela - Farangi
 Jaggi Malik - Kikara
 Sawan - Shamsher
 Khawar Abbas
 Tanni

Songs (album)

References

External links
 * 
 

1980s action drama films
Pakistani action drama films
Pakistani fantasy films
1983 fantasy films
1983 films
Punjabi-language Pakistani films
1980s Punjabi-language films
1983 directorial debut films
1983 drama films